Short-handed is a term used in ice hockey and several related sports, including water polo, and refers to having fewer skaters (players) on the ice during play, as a result of a penalty. The player removed from play serves the penalty in the penalty box for a set amount of time proportional to the severity of the infraction. If a goaltender commits a minor infraction, another player who was on the ice at the time of the penalty serves, often but not necessarily the team captain.

The penalized team is said to be on the penalty kill, abbreviated as "PK" for recording purposes, while their players are in the penalty box. The opposing team is usually referred to as having an "advantage" until the penalized player returns to play. This situation is often called a power play for the opposing team. The advantage largely comes from having an additional player, making it impossible for the short-handed team to defend every player one-on-one and, in the event the short-handed team is making an offensive run, the team on the power play can double-team one of the short-handed team's players while still covering everyone else.

The short-handed team has one advantage during a power play: it is free to ice the puck without the play being stopped and thus can change lines at roughly the same intervals as during five-on-five play. This advantage can also be exploited by skaters with enough speed and offensive skill: without the threat of icing, breakaways can be more safely attempted, which opens the opportunity for short-handed goals. However, two governing bodies have enforced icing on power plays, thus putting the short-handed team at an even stronger disadvantage:
 The World Hockey Association did so during the 1970s.
 USA Hockey has done so in all sanctioned youth competitions (players 14 and under, in all age groups) since 2017–18.

The team on the power play often only has one defenseman at the rear rather than the typical two, in favor of adding another attacker. Rarely, teams have pulled their goalie for the sixth on-ice player (such as in Game 2 of the 1993 Stanley Cup Finals). Players assigned to power play or penalty killing duties are often known as "special teams."

If the team with the power play scores a goal while the other team is short-handed, the penalty is over, except if a goal was scored during a major penalty or a match penalty in regulation time.

In leagues that reduce the number of players on the ice in overtime, the concept still exists, but is slightly modified to accommodate the reduced team size. For example, overtime during regular-season NHL games uses a 3-on-3 format, with each side having three skaters plus the goaltender. If a player is penalized during overtime, he is sent to the penalty box, but can be replaced by another player. However, the non-penalized team receives an extra skater for the duration of the penalty. If the penalty expires without a goal being scored, the extra skater is removed from the ice and play continues. If regulation time ends with a power play in progress, the advantaged team will start overtime with more than three skaters (almost always four, very rarely five).

5-on-3
A team can have two players in the penalty box, but can only be limited to three players on the ice at any given time. If the other team is at full strength and the penalized team has two players in the penalty box, plus a goalie in net, the situation is called a Five on three. This situation gives the team on the power play an even greater chance of scoring. If the advantaged team on the 5-on-3 scores, the player who took the earlier of the two penalties may return to the ice, and play resumes as a power play with only one player in the penalty box. However, if the first penalty taken was a double-minor penalty, the penalty that expires is the first penalty of the double-minor, and the clock then begins to run down on the second penalty, with the 5-on-3 continuing.

A call for too many men on the ice in a 5-on-3 situation in the last two minutes of regulation or in overtime now results in a penalty shot. This current rule resulted from Coach Roger Neilson's exploitation of rule loopholes during an OHL game when his team was up one goal, but was down two men in a five-on-three situation for the last minute of the game. Realizing that more penalties could not be served under the existing rules, Neilson put too many men on the ice every ten seconds. The referees stopped the play and a face-off was held, relieving pressure on the defense.

In regular-season overtime in the NHL, a 5-on-3 situation is possible if two players on one team are serving penalties at the same time.

Short-handed goals
A short-handed goal is a goal scored in ice hockey when a team's on-ice players are outnumbered by the opposing team's. Normally, a team would be outnumbered because of a penalty incurred. However, the opposing team on the power play often only has one defenseman at the rear rather than the typical two, in favor of adding another attacker. This strategy can often be exploited by the short-handed team, if they do manage to get the puck out into the neutral zone leaving most of the opposing players behind, and the penalty killers may enjoy odd man rushes and breakaways against the single defenseman of the advantaged team. As previously noted, the suspension of icing rules also allows passes to be longer and the puck to be dumped and chased without stopping play. Unlike power play goals, shorthanded goals cannot end penalties except if a shorthanded goal is scored in overtime, which automatically ends the game.

When one team pulls its goalie near the end of a game to play with an extra attacker, any goal scored on the empty net is not considered to be short-handed (because there are equal numbers of players on ice for the teams).

Short-handed goals are somewhat infrequent when a team is down one player, and some instances have occurred where two short-handed goals have been scored on the same penalty. Very rarely is a short-handed goal scored by a team that is down two players. (The general approach when down two men is for the opposing team to assume the "iron cross:" establish a diamond shape with one forward, two defensemen and the goaltender, remain in the defensive zone, and clear the puck whenever possible, without making any effort to make an offensive play and jeopardize the already weakened defensive position.) Former Philadelphia Flyers captain Mike Richards holds the record for most career 3-on-5 goals with three, having attained the last one during the 2008-09 season.  The quickest trio of short-handed goals ever scored in a National Hockey League game occurred on April 10, 2010 during a game at the TD Garden between the Boston Bruins and Carolina Hurricanes, when the Bruins scored three short-handed goals against Carolina goaltender Cam Ward in only 1:04 of game time, during a minor hooking penalty to Bruins defenseman Matt Hunwick.  The Boston Bruins also made NHL history for those short-handed goals, as it was the first time that a team scored three times on a single penalty kill (Daniel Paille, Blake Wheeler, Steve Begin).   The most short-handed goals ever scored in one NHL game by one team occurred on April 7, 1995, when the Winnipeg Jets scored four, the most since the end of the era of the Original Six teams of the NHL.

See also
Power play
D-zone coverage

References

Ice hockey rules
Ice hockey terminology